The Sainted Sisters is a 1948 American comedy film starring Veronica Lake and co-starring Joan Caulfield, Barry Fitzgerald, George Reeves, William Demarest and Beulah Bondi. The film was distributed by Paramount Pictures and is notable for being the last film Veronica Lake made under her contract with the studio.

Plot
After escaping New York City with the loot from a successful scam they pulled, sisters Letty and Jane Stanton decide to hide out in a small town in Maine close to the Canada–US border. Robbie McCleary takes them in, only to discover the large surplus of money mysteriously appearing.

The girls reluctantly get involved in a charity program and unwittingly become the local celebrities of the town, something that causes a problem when their fame attracts attention outside the small town and the people affected by their previous scams begin to catch up with them.

Cast

Veronica Lake as Letty Stanton
Joan Caulfield as Jane Stanton
Barry Fitzgerald as Robbie McCleary
George Reeves as Sam Stoaks
William Demarest as Vern Tewilliger
Beulah Bondi as Hester Rivercomb
Chill Wills as Will Twitched
Kathryn Card as Martha Tewilliger
Darryl Hickman as Jud Tewilliger
Jimmy Hunt as David Frisbee
Clancy Cooper as Cal Frisbee
Dorothy Adams as Widow Davitt
Hank Worden as Taub Beasley
Ray Walker as Abel Rivercomb

Production
Elisa Bialk wrote a short story, The Sainted Sisters of Sandy Creek. It was adapted into a play by Bialk and Alden Nash, which was to be produced by the Theatre Guild in 1944 as a possible vehicle for Tallulah Bankhead. However the play was never produced.

Film rights were bought by Paramount in July 1946. They originally announced Betty Hutton would star from a Mindred Lord script, co-starring Diana Lynn (sister), John Lund (minister) and Sterling Hayden (cop), with Val Lewton to produce and Mitchell Leisen to direct in early 1947.

However Hutton and Leisen wound up instead working on Dream Girl and the project was postponed. It was re-activated later in 1947 with Hutton still down as star; George Marshall was to direct and Richard Maibaum was to produce from a R Richard Nash and Mary McCall script. William Demarest, Sterling Hayden, Barry Fitzgerald and Joan Caulfield were to support Hutton.

Hutton dropped out to go on maternity leave and was replaced by Veronica Lake; George Marshall was replaced as director by William Russell. Sterling Hayden refused to play his role and was put on suspension. His role was taken by George Reeves, who had already been cast in the film but in a smaller role. Filming started in October 1947.

This was the last film Veronica Lake made under her contract with Paramount. She had previously been one of their top stars throughout the early 1940s.

The Sainted Sisters also proved to be one of the last films George Reeves starred in before being offered the coveted part of Superman in the popular television show Adventures of Superman.

Reception
Diabolique said "maybe this would’ve worked if Betty Hutton had been able to play the lead, as originally intended. Instead Paramount went with Lake who is disastrously miscast, lacking sparkle and verve in a part that needs, well, Hutton – or even Diana Lynn.  Joan Caulfield has some game as her sister but is mostly just pretty. Mind you, neither have much of a character to play."

References

External links
 

Review of film at New York Times
Review of film at Variety

1948 films
1940s crime comedy films
American crime comedy films
American black-and-white films
Films directed by William D. Russell
Films set in Maine
Films set in the 1890s
Paramount Pictures films
1948 comedy films
1940s English-language films
1940s American films